Nicholas Beaumont (born before 1526 – 1585), of Coleorton, Leicestershire, was an English politician.

He was the eldest son of Richard Beaumont of Coleorton.

He was a Justice of the Peace for Leicestershire from 1588 and was appointed High Sheriff of Leicestershire for 1577–78.

He was elected a Member (MP) of the Parliament of England for Leicestershire in 1563 and 1572 and for Bramber in 1584.

He married Anne, the daughter of William Saunders of Welford, Northamptonshire and had 4 sons, including his heir Henry Beaumont, MP for Leicester and another son, Thomas Beaumont who succeeded his brother as MP for Leicester.

References

1585 deaths
Members of the Parliament of England for Leicestershire
People from Coleorton
English MPs 1563–1567
Year of birth uncertain
English MPs 1572–1583
High Sheriffs of Leicestershire